Nassa is a genus of sea snails, marine gastropod mollusks in the subfamily Rapaninae  of the family Muricidae, the murex snails or rock snails.

Taxonomy
The history of the name Nassa is rather confused, because the name was allocated twice:
 Nassa Röding, 1798 for mainly muricid species with the type species : Nassa picta Röding, 1798 (= Nassa serta (Bruguière, 1798).
 Nassa Lamarck, 1799 : established for the species Buccinum mutabile Linnaeus, 1758, which is now classified as a synonym of Nassarius  Duméril, 1805 in the family Nassariidae.

In the 19th and much of the 20th century, all species that were added to the genus Nassa were Nassa mud snails belonging to the family Nassariidae. After the rediscovery of Röding's catalogue of his collection Museum Boltenianum sive catalogus cimeliorum e tribus regnis naturæ quæ olim collegerat Joa. Fried Bolten, M. D. p. d. per XL. annos proto physicus Hamburgensis. Pars secunda continens conchylia sive testacea univalvia, bivalvia & multivalvia, the muricid genus  Nassa Röding, 1798 was given priority over the genus Nassa named by Lamarck.

Nassa Lamarck was then synonymized with its oldest synonym Nassarius Duméril, 1806 by a ruling of the ICZN Op. 96, Direction 48 (21 Nov 1956) and then to Nassarius (Sphaeronassa) Locard, 1886.

Species
Species within the genus Nassa include:
 Nassa francolina (Bruguière, 1789)
 Nassa serta (Bruguière, 1789)
 Nassa situla (Reeve, 1846)
 Nassa tuamotuensis Houart, 1996

Species based on Nassa Röding brought into synonymy  
 Nassa francolinus (Bruguière, 1789): synonym of Nassa francolina (Bruguière, 1789)
 Nassa hepatica (Pulteney, 1799): synonym of Nassarius hepaticus (Pulteney, 1799)
 Nassa ligata Röding, 1798: synonym of Nucella lapillus (Linnaeus, 1758)
 Nassa lunata Say, 1826: synonym of Astyris lunata (Say, 1826)
 Nassa molliana Chemnitz, 1780: synonym of Babylonia valentiana (Swainson, 1822)
 Nassa picta Röding, 1798: synonym of  Nassa serta (Bruguière, 1789)
 Nassa rudis Roding, 1798: synonym of  Nucella lapillus (Linnaeus, 1758)
 Nassa subcancellata Turton, 1932: synonym of  Aesopus angustus Lussi, 2001
 Nassa varians Dunker, 1860: synonym of  Mitrella bicincta (Gould, 1860)

 Species based on Nassa Lamarck brought into synonymy  
 Nassa costulata (Renieri, 1804): synonym of  Nassarius cuvierii (Payraudeau, 1826)
 Nassa granum: synonym of Nassarius grana (Lamarck, 1822)
 Nassa kraussiana Dunker, 1846: synonym of Nassarius kraussianus (Dunker, 1846)
 Nassa lathraia: synonym of Nassarius sinusigerus (A. Adams, 1852)
 Nassa miser (Dall, 1908): synonym of  Nassarius coppingeri (E.A. Smith, 1881)
 Nassa munda: synonym of Nassarius idyllius (Melvill & Standen, 1901)
 Nassa obockensis: synonym of Nassarius deshayesianus (Issel, 1866)

 Nassa optima G.B. Sowerby III, 1903: synonym of Nassarius optimus (G.B. Sowerby III, 1903)
 Nassa pagoda (Reeve, 1844): synonym of Nassarius pagodus (Reeve, 1844)
 Nassa pulla (Linnaeus, 1758): synonym of Nassarius pullus (Linnaeus, 1758)
 Nassa semistriata: synonym of †  Nassarius semistriatus (Brocchi, 1814)
 Nassa steindachneri: synonym of Nassarius siquijorensis (A. Adams, 1852)
 Nassa stiphra: synonym of Nassarius agapetus (Watson, 1882)
 Nassa tegula Reeve, 1853: synonym of  Nassarius striatus (C.B. Adams, 1852)
 Nassa xesta: synonym of Nassarius comptus (A. Adams, 1852)

References

 Houart R. (1996) The genus Nassa Röding 1798 in the Indo-West Pacific (Gastropoda: Prosobranchia: Muricidae: Rapaninae). Archiv für Molluskenkunde 126(1-2):51-63
 Claremont M., Vermeij G.J., Williams S.T. & Reid D.G. (2013) Global phylogeny and new classification of the Rapaninae (Gastropoda: Muricidae), dominant molluscan predators on tropical rocky seashores. Molecular Phylogenetics and Evolution 66: 91–102.

External links
 Röding, P.F. (1798). Museum Boltenianum sive Catalogus cimeliorum e tribus regnis naturæ quæ olim collegerat Joa. Fried Bolten, M. D. p. d. per XL. annos proto physicus Hamburgensis. Pars secunda continens Conchylia sive Testacea univalvia, bivalvia & multivalvia. Trapp, Hamburg. viii, 199 pp
 Adams, H. & Adams, A. (1853-1858). The genera of Recent Mollusca; arranged according to their organization. London, van Voorst.